Heartaches is a live album by American saxophonist Dexter Gordon recorded at the Jazzhus Montmartre in Copenhagen, Denmark in 1965 by Danmarks Radio and released on the SteepleChase label in 2005.

Critical reception 

AllMusic critic Thom Jurek stated "The recording quality can be a tiny bit iffy at times, but the performance is stellar and more than makes up for the few rough spots in the session. Recommended". All About Jazz reviewer Derek Taylor stated "While this is an enjoyable snapshot from the saxophonist's fecund middle period as an expatriate jazz icon enjoying all the amenities commensurate with his status, there isn't much to push this album beyond the body of song already available".

Track listing 
 "Heartaches" (Al Hoffman, John Klenner) – 14:15
 "Devilette" (Ben Tucker) – 12:26
 "You've Changed" (Bill Carey, Carl T. Fischer) – 10:19
 Introduction – 0:58
 "So What" (Miles Davis) – 9:43

Personnel 
Dexter Gordon – tenor saxophone
Kenny Drew – piano
Niels-Henning Ørsted Pedersen – bass
Alex Riel – drums

References 

SteepleChase Records live albums
Dexter Gordon live albums
2004 live albums
Albums recorded at Jazzhus Montmartre